The AEG C.VII was a prototype two-seat biplane reconnaissance aircraft of World War I. It was developed from the C.IV but did not enter production. The C.VII was tested with two different wing arrangements, one with slightly tapered single bay wings and another with sharply swept upper wing.

Specifications (AEG C.VII)

See also

References

Further reading

 Kroschel, Günter; Stützer, Helmut: Die deutschen Militärflugzeuge 1910-18, Wilhelmshaven 1977
 Munson, Kenneth: Bomber 1914–19, Zürich 1968, Nr. 20
 Nowarra, Heinz: Die Entwicklung der Flugzeuge 1914-18, München 1959
 Sharpe, Michael: Doppeldecker, Dreifachdecker & Wasserflugzeuge, Gondrom, Bindlach 2001, 

C.VII
Single-engined tractor aircraft
Biplanes
1910s German military reconnaissance aircraft
Aircraft first flown in 1916